Hranjigovci is a settlement in the Slovene Hills northwest of Ormož in northeastern Slovenia. It belongs to the Municipality of Sveti Tomaž, which became an independent municipality in 2006. The area traditionally belonged to the Styria region and is now included in the Drava Statistical Region.

There is a small roadside chapel-shrine with a belfry in the northeastern part of the village. It was built in the early 20th century.

References

External links
Hranjigovci on Geopedia

Populated places in the Municipality of Sveti Tomaž